Rola Nashef is an American director, screenwriter, producer and multimedia artist based in Detroit. She is best known for her award-winning film, Detroit Unleaded.

Early life

Nashef was born in Sidon, Lebanon to Franco and Salima Nashef. Her father Franco is from Maghdouché, where her mother Salima is from Deir Mimas; both small Christian villages in the south of Lebanon. In 1978, her family fled the Lebanese Civil War and immigrated to the United States where they settled in Lansing, Michigan where her father worked as a skilled tradesmen at General Motors.

Nashef graduated from Waverly High School and went on to study at Lansing Community College. She then attended Michigan State University, Madonna University and Oakland Community College where she studied political science, marketing research, paralegal studies, sociology, accounting, art and photography, before graduating from the Motion Picture Institute in [1997] with a degree in Directing and Producing.

Career 

Nashef's debut short film, 8:30 , a romantic comedy short film that was presented at the Arab Screen Independent Film Festival in Doha, Qatar during 2001.  She raised 20,000 through a letter writing fundraising campaign to develop and direct her second short film, Detroit unleaded, and won “Best Short Film” at the Trinity Film Festival and  "Best Performance" at the New Haven Underground Film Festival.

As a slice-of-life dramedy that centers around an Arab-owned 24-hour gas station, Detroit Unleaded holds its place in American cinema history as the very first Arab-American romantic comedy portraying second generation Arab characters specific to Detroit and Dearborn. The film premiered in 2012 at the Toronto International Film Festival, won the inaugural Grolsch Film Works Discovery Award. Prior to its release, Detroit Unleaded, was supported by the Sundance Institute Screenwriters Lab, IFP New York, Lincoln Center and the A2E Distribution Lab, SFFS.

Nashef worked and served as a multimedia artist on Facing Identity, a permanent installation in the Arab American National Museum.

Awards 
 Adrienne Shelly Directors Award, Adrienne Shelly Foundation, 2015
 Kresge Arts in Detroit Fellowship Award, 2014
 Adrienne Shelley Director's Award for her script NADIA'S HOUSE, 2014
 Best Feature for Detroit Unleaded, American Spectrum, Indianapolis International Film Festival, 2013
 Audience Award for Detroit Unleaded, Twin Cities Arab Film Festival, 2013
 Grolsch Film Works Discovery Award, Toronto International Film Festival, 2012
 Named one of the "25 New Faces of Independent Film", Filmmaker Magazine, 2011

References

External links

 

Year of birth missing (living people)
Living people
People from Sidon
Lebanese emigrants to the United States
American women screenwriters
American women film directors
American women film producers
American film producers
21st-century American women